Allison Transmission is an American manufacturer of commercial duty automatic transmissions and hybrid propulsion systems. Allison products are specified by over 250 vehicle manufacturers and are used in many market sectors including bus, refuse, fire, construction, distribution, military, and specialty applications.

With headquarters in Indianapolis, Indiana, Allison Transmission has regional offices all over the world and manufacturing facilities in Indianapolis, Chennai, India, and Szentgotthárd, Hungary.

History

Racing team
Allison began in 1909 when James A. Allison, along with three business partners, helped fund and build the Indianapolis Motor Speedway.  In 1911, Allison's new track held the first Indianapolis 500 mile race. In addition to funding several race teams, James Allison founded the Speedway Racing Team Company on September 14, 1915 and quickly gained a reputation for his work on race cars and automotive technology in general. Allison built a shop near the track and changed the team's name to the Allison Experimental Company; the shop later became Plant No. 1.

Wartime aviation
When World War I began, Allison suspended racing, and the Allison Experimental Company began machining parts, tools, and masters for the Liberty airplane engine — the main power plant used in the US war effort. After the war, Allison entered a car in the 1919 Indy 500 and won. It was the last race Allison's team ever entered as he turned his company's attention to aviation engineering, renaming it to Allison Engineering Company; the aviation-focused company developed steel-backed bronze sleeve bearings for the crankshaft and connecting rods, and high-speed reduction gearing to turn propellers and Roots-type blowers. The company's reputation and expertise in aviation was the major factor in General Motors decision to buy the company following James Allison's death in 1928.

Shortly after the sale to General Motors on April 1, 1929, Allison engineers began work on a 12-cylinder engine to replace the aging Liberty engines. The result was the V1710 12-cylinder aircraft engine and it made the company, renamed to the Allison Division of GM in 1934, also known as the Allison Engine Company, a major force in aviation. Plant 3 was built in 1939, a  factory to build V1710 engines. Due to demand during World War II, Allison would add a second factory (Plant 5) and 23,000 new employees; by the end of the war, Allison had built 70,000 V1710 engines.

Early transmission development
Alongside the development and production of the V1710, engineers at GM began designing the CD-850 cross-drive steering transmission for tracked military vehicles in 1941; the design was completed in 1944 and Allison was awarded the contract to manufacture the prototypes. In February 1945, General Motors formed the Allison Transmission Engineering Section, dividing the subsidiary into Aircraft Operations and Transmission Operations in 1946. The CD-850 combined range change, steering and braking. Allison stopped producing the CD-850 in 1986, but a licensed version was produced in Spain for more than a decade afterward.

General Motors began developing automatic transmissions with a hydraulic torque converter in the 1930s under its Product Study Group, offering it as an option for Oldsmobile for the first time in 1940. After World War II, Allison Transmission turned its attention to civilian transportation. Allison designed, developed and manufactured the first-ever automatic transmissions for heavy-duty vehicles including delivery trucks, city buses, and locomotives, starting from 1948. In addition, Allison marketed transmissions for off-highway heavy-duty vehicles under the brand Powershift TORQMATIC, with the first TG series transmissions being produced in July 1948.

V-Drive
At approximately the same time the CD-850 was going into production, GMC Truck and Coach Division requested that GM develop a V-Drive transmission with a torque converter in 1945 for transit bus use, replacing the Spicer manual transmission then offered. These buses had rear-mounted engines and to maximize passenger space, the engine compartment was minimized; the V-Drive transmission was named for the 63° angle of intersection between the transmission shaft input (from the engine) and output (to the rear axle). Development of the V-Drive transmission was led by Bob Schaefer, an emigrant from Germany who had joined GM in 1942 after helping to lead the Twin Disc Company, which was one of the licensees of the Ljungstroms hydraulic torque converter. Schaefer was reassigned from the Detroit Transmission Division to Allison in 1946.

The first production V-Drive transmissions were delivered in October 1947, with the first major contract being for 900 buses in 1948, for New York City. The VS-2 was introduced in 1955, which added a two-speed input splitter; a version with both hydraulic and direct clutches was introduced in 1958 (VH), and production of the original V-Drive transmissions was concluded in July 1976, with 65,389 produced.

Commercial transmissions
In addition to the transit bus market, Allison began developing automatic transmissions for commercial trucks in 1953. This effort resulted in the MT-25, which designated the intended application ("M"edium "T"rucks) and maximum input power, . The MT-25 was a 6-speed automatic, using a two-speed high/low splitter and three-speed double planetary gear train. The splitter was equipped with a hydraulic retarder. Because of the additional cost of the automatic transmission, sales were initially slow until Allison began targeting specific markets that required both on- and off-road driving as well as frequent stops and starts, such as concrete mixing and garbage trucks in the early 1960s. The MT-25 was fitted first as an option branded POWERMATIC by Chevrolet, exclusive to that brand for the first year, but was soon offered by other truck manufacturers including Ford (1957), Reo (1958), Dodge (1958), Diamond T (1959), White (1961), and International Harvester (1961); production of the MT-25 continued into the early 1970s.

The MT-25 was supplemented in September 1970 by a second-generation lighter-duty automatic transmission, the four-speed AT-540, which Allison developed jointly with Hydramatic Division in the late 1960s; the AT-540 was targeted specifically for on-highway use and shared similarities with automobile transmissions to reduce the cost penalty to equip on-highway trucks with automatic transmissions. Later, the MT-25 itself was replaced by the MT-640 and a heavier-duty version, the HT-740, was introduced; the new MT and HT were both derived from the AT-540. As an option, the MT-6nn and HT-7nn series transmissions could be equipped with a lower fifth gear for severe off-road conditions. In 1970, GM combined the Allison and Detroit Diesel divisions as the Detroit Diesel Allison Division of GM.

In 1976, a 700-series V-Drive transmission was introduced for buses, the V730. The AT/MT/HT were still being produced in 1998.

Allison also produced off-highway transmissions in the 1960s, starting with the "Dual Path Powershift" DP 8000 series. The first electronic controls were fitted to the off-highway DP 8000 series transmission in 1971. Electronic controls (branded the Allison Transmission Electronic Control or ATEC system) were added to the MT/HT/V730 in 1983, improving fuel economy by more precisely controlling shifts.

World Transmission

The third-generation six-speed World Transmission (WT) was introduced in 1991, replacing the second-generation AT/MT/HT/V730 lines. Development of the WT had begun in the mid-1980s, prior to the sale of Detroit Diesel to Roger Penske in 1987. The WT used the WT electronic control (WTEC) system to control the internal clutches during shifting, equipped with a control unit that adapts to variations during use. The WT line was split into MD (medium duty), HD (heavy duty, introduced in 1993), and B (T-drive buses) lines; the MD and HD lines were later renamed to the 3000 and 4000 Series, respectively.

 in the United States, Allison had built 92% of the transmissions in school buses; 75% of transit bus transmissions, 65% of heavy-duty garbage truck transmissions, and 32% of all medium-duty truck transmissions.

Allison followed the WT (3000 and 4000 Series) line with the 1000 and 2000 Series starting in 1999. The 1000 Series transmission incorporated many features from the WT line for light-duty trucks, including the electronic control system, and was initially available as an option with the 6.6L GM/Isuzu Duramax diesel engine and the 8.1L Vortec gasoline engine for the trucks based on the GMT800 platform.

In 2007, GM sold Allison Transmission to private equity firms Carlyle Group and Onex Corporation for US$5.6 billion.

Timeline

1940s
1949—Allison begins production of CD-850 tank transmission, division's most historically significant transmission
December 1949—First rail car transmission is produced; installed in the Budd Rail Car

1950s
1954—First off-highway transmissions (CRT-5530/CRT-3330)
1955—Allison develops the MT-25/POWERMATIC transmission for on-highway use with Chevrolet

1960s
October 1960—First Allison XT-1410-2 transmission is produced
June 1961—Allison announces MT Series transmissions
July 1962—Allison TT-2000 Hydro Powershift transmission is introduced
March 1965—Introduction of dual path DP-8000, largest single-package Allison Powershift transmission to date
November 1966—Lithium-chlorine fuel cell is unveiled
June 1967—Allison begins production of new DP-8960 for large off-highway trucks
October 1967—First prototype of the Allison-equipped U.S. Army main battle tank is unveiled in Washington, D.C.
February 1969—Allison introduces electric gearshift control system for off-highway vehicles
July 1969—Apollo 11 astronauts make man's first landing on the moon; propellant tanks built by Allison are part of the Service Module

1970s
September 1970—Merge with Detroit Diesel Engine to form Detroit Diesel Allison Division, headquarters in Detroit
GVW highway vehicles; Allison model HT-740
April 1973—First fully automatic transmission for large trucks, scrapers and other types of heavy-duty off-highway vehicles is introduced; Allison model CLBT 750
1974—First European office is established

1980s
October 1982—A new generation heavy-duty automatic transmission, the Allison DP 8962, is announced; incorporates over 15 new technology internal changes
May 1983—GM sells Allison Gas Turbine Division; Allison becomes part of newly formed GM Power Products and Defense Operations Group
June 1986—First X200 military transmission is released
December 1987—Detroit Diesel Allison becomes Allison Transmission, Division of General Motors

1990s
February 1991—Allison introduces electronically controlled World Transmissions
November 1995—Allison adopts lean manufacturing principles and begins implementing Allison Production System (APS), a cellular manufacturing system; some 10,000 machines and support equipment are re-arranged through all plants
1999--Hybrid bus program is demonstrated for New York City Transit Authority
June 1999—Allison introduces 1000 Series and 2000 Series fully automatic transmissions

2000s
2000--Hybrid electric program is launched
September 2000—Test Track 2000 is first customer ride and drive simulating real-world operating conditions; held at Walt Disney World in Orlando, Florida
January 2001—Allison unveils first-of-its-kind parallel hybrid technology
November 2003—Allison's Ultimate Truck Driving Adventure takes ride and drive experience to extremes in the high desert of Nevada
November 2003—Allison Vocational Models are released to better serve specific applications
May 2005--Shanghai Customization Center is opened
June 2007—GM announced that it was selling Allison Transmission to private equity firms The Carlyle Group and Onex Corporation, in a deal valued at $5.6 billion. The transaction closed on August 7, 2007.
2008—Allison introduces on-board prognostics on model-year 2009 automatic transmissions
2009—Allison took an approximately 10% stake in UK-based Torotrak manufacturer of Infinitely Variable Transmission (IVT).

2010s
2010-Manufacturing plant opened in Chennai, India also establishing regional headquarters with executive, marketing and sales offices
June 2010-Allison dedicates a new hybrid manufacturing plant in Indianapolis, Indiana.

March 15, 2012 Initial public offering of 26.3 million shares of Allison Transmission stock at $23/share on the New York Stock Exchange under the symbol ALSN.
October 27, 2013 Allison 10-speed TC10 transmission available for order at Navistar
Current revenues were at $1.985 Billion a decrease from 2014.

Products

Allison markets its transmissions by vocational series according to the intended use; for example, the Tractor Series is sold for and installed in Class 8 tractors, while the Motorhome Series is marketed to manufacturers of recreational vehicles. A transmission is given a designation specific to the vocational series, but is otherwise identical mechanically to other transmissions sold for other vocational series; for example, the Bus Series B210 / B220 / B295 transmissions are also sold with identical gearing as:

 1000HS (Highway Series)
 1000MH (Motorhome Series)
 1000EVS (Emergency Vehicle Series)
 1000RDS (Rugged Duty Series)
 1000PTS (Pupil Transport/Shuttle Series)
 1000SP (Specialty Series)
 1350HS/MH/EVS/RDS/PTS/SP
 2100HS/MH/EVS/RDS/PTS/SP
 2200HS/MH/EVS/RDS/PTS/SP
 2350HS/MH/EVS/RDS/PTS/SP

Collectively, these are grouped into the 1000/2000 Series transmission family; transmissions within a family share the same basic dimensions, power input capabilities, and weight. Allison transmission families include the 1000/2000 Series, 3000 Series, 4000 Series, 5000 Series, 6000 Series, 8000 Series, 9000 Series, and Tractor Series. Each transmission family is given a generational designation based on the electronic control system; parts generally are not interchangeable between generations within a specific family:
 Gen 1 / Gen 2 (aka World Transmission or World Transmission Electronic Controller (WTEC) / WTEC II) —1991–98
 Gen 3 — 1998–2004/05
 Gen 4 — 2004/05–2012
 Gen 5 — 2012–present

Hybrid bus series
First generation

GM-Allison introduced hybrid vehicle technology for transit buses in 2003. Allison hybrid transit bus products were initially branded as the Allison Electric Drives EP System, which included the following components:
 EV Drive Unit – integrating the Generator and Electric Motor in the diagram
 Inverter (Dual Power Inverter Module, DPIM) – integrating the Charger and Converter in the diagram
 Battery (Energy Storage System, ESS, or Energy Storage Unit)
 Hybrid Control Modules (Transmission Control Module, TCM; and Vehicle Control Module, VCM)

Allison characterizes the system as the "Two-Mode Compound Split Parallel Hybrid Architecture". Under full-throttle, the vehicle's initial launch in the low-speed mode is boosted by the output motor. As vehicle speed increases, the input motor begins to dominate, resulting in nearly total mechanical output only. Through 2011, GM intended to introduce 16 passenger car and truck hybrid models based on the Allison split-mode system. The primary benefit of the Allison hybrid system is in recapturing kinetic energy during regenerative braking and storing it as electrical energy, which can later be converted back to kinetic energy through an output motor, which assists in accelerating the vehicle, reducing demand on the engine and consequently fuel consumption. Fuel economy is improved by up to 60%, and acceleration can also be improved compared to a conventional bus.

To the operator, the hybrid system is automatic and requires no special training. Under normal in-motion operation, engine speed is controlled by the TCM, which commands a torque and speed point based on the needs of the hybrid system. During startup and shutdown, the TCM commands only a speed requirement.

The EV Drive Unit is installed in lieu of a conventional transmission and acts as a continuously variable transmission controlled electronically; it integrates two motor-generators (Motor A and Motor B, on the input and output, respectively), three planetary gear sets, one rotating clutch, and one stationary clutch. From the engine, power is transferred to the input shaft through an input damper instead of the conventional torque converter found in an automatic transmission. The input shaft is coupled to the main shaft and Motor A through a planetary gearset (P1), and Motor A is coupled to Motor B through another planetary gearset (P2). Motor B is coupled to the output shaft through a third planetary gearset (P3) and the stationary (C1) and rotating (C2) clutches. Both motors are three-phase AC induction motors and automatically switch from motoring to generation when the mechanical rotation frequency exceeds the stator field frequency.

There are two drive units available (EP40 or H 40 EP; and EP50 or H 50 EP). The H40 is intended for regular transit bus use, while the H50 is for articulated and suburban coaches, similar in size and application to the B400 and B500 Bus Series transmissions, respectively.

The DPIM includes an inverter for each motor; the continuous and peak output are 160 and 300 kW, respectively. The ESS is made of three sub-strings wired in parallel with a storage capacity of 450 A and 624 VDC. Each sub-string uses two 312 V sub-packs in series, which are made of 40 7.8-volt modules. Six battery control information modules (BCIM) monitor temperature, one in each sub-pack. The DPIM and ESS have been improved since the initial introduction, and newer models generally can replace earlier units. In addition, newer installations include a DC-DC converter, a solid-state device that converts the high-voltage traction motor energy to 12/24V accessory power.

As of 2008, there are more than 2,700 GM-Allison hybrid buses operating in 81 cities in the U.S., Canada and Europe. This includes:

 Translink (Vancouver)
 Dresden, Germany
 King County Metro Transit Authority
 Massachusetts Bay Transportation Authority
 Minneapolis-Saint Paul Metro Transit
 Regional Transportation Commission of Southern Nevada
 Southeastern Pennsylvania Transportation Authority
 Washington Metropolitan Area Transit Authority
 Regional Transportation District Denver, CO
 Maryland Transit Administration
 Indianapolis Public Transportation Corporation
 Chicago Transit Authority

Second generation
Allison introduced its second-generation eGen Flex diesel-electric hybrid drive unit in 2022, partnering with Gillig; the first units will be delivered to IndyGo, serving Indianapolis. eGen Flex is available as multiple models, designated eGen Flex 40, 40 CertPlus, 40 Max, or 40 Max CertPlus (equivalent to the H 40 in physical size, input, and output capabilities); or the eGen Flex 50, 50 CertPlus, 50 Max, or 50 Max CertPlus (equivalent to the H 50).

Electric axles
In 2020, Allison introduced a line of motor-integrated electric axles, branded eGen Power.

The Allison eGen Power integrated axle also includes a multi-speed gearbox to optimize both launch and cruising speeds; it was designed to be a drop-in replacement for existing axles for medium- and heavy-duty trucks and buses, allowing more flexibility in battery placement.

Current products (Gen 5)

Notes

Discontinued

Off-highway
The model designations for off-highway transmissions marketed under the Powershift TORQMATIC brand were in the format AAAA 1234, where:

On-highway
First Generation
Allison V transmission—VH, VH2, VH4, VH5, VH6, VH7, VH9, VS1, VS2-6, VS2-8
Allison MT transmission—MT25, MT30, MT31, MT40, MT41, MT42
Allison HT transmission—HT70
Second Generation
Allison M and MH marine reverse and reduction gear
Allison AT transmission—AT540, AT542, AT543, AT545 (4 speeds)
Allison MT transmission—MT640, MT643, MT644, MT647, MT648, MT650, MT653DR, MT654CR, MTB643, MTB644, MTB647, MTB648, MTB653DR, MTB654CR
Allison HT transmission—HT740D, HT740RS, HT741, HT746, HT747, HT748, HTB748, HT750CRD, HT750DRD, HT754CRD, HT755CRD,  HT755DRD, HTB755CRD, HTB755DRD
Allison V transmission—V730, V731, VR731, VR731RH
Third Generation
Allison World Transmission (MD and HD)—MD3060, MD3060P, MD3560, MD3560P, MD3066, MD3066P, HD4060, HD4060P, HD4560, HD4560P

References

External links

Hybrid Buses
 Hybrid buses will save an estimated  of fuel annually in Washington D.C., Philadelphia and Minneapolis/St. Paul
  Low-Emissions Hybrid Buses.

Auto parts suppliers of the United States
Automotive transmission makers
Manufacturing companies based in Indianapolis
Manufacturing companies established in 1915
1915 establishments in Indiana
Truck manufacturers of the United States
Hybrid electric bus manufacturers
2012 initial public offerings
Companies listed on the New York Stock Exchange
2007 mergers and acquisitions
The Carlyle Group companies
Bus manufacturers of the United States
Electric vehicle manufacturers of the United States
Former General Motors subsidiaries